2019 EuroHockey Nations Championship may refer to:

2019 Women's EuroHockey Nations Championship
2019 Men's EuroHockey Nations Championship